Nelis J. Saunders (September 3, 1923February 10, 2012) was a Michigan politician.

Early life
Saunders was born on September 3, 1923 in Orlando, Florida.

Education
Saunders earned an A.A. from Florida Memorial College. Saunders attended Wayne State University where she studied journalism.

Career
Saunders worked for the Michigan Chronicle. In 1960 and 1962, Saunders was defeated in the Democratic primary for the Michigan House of Representatives seat representing the Wayne County 11th district. In 1964, Saunders was again defeated in the primary for the Michigan Senate seat representing the 4th district. Saunders was defeated in two more primaries for the state House, for the 24th district in 1965 and the 11th district in 1966. On November 7, 1968, Saunders was elected to the Michigan House of Representatives where she represented the 9th district from January 8, 1969 to 1972. After her career in the state House, Saunders went on to be defeated in two more primaries, for the 20th district in 1972 and the 24th district in 1974.

Personal life
Saunders was a member of the NAACP. Saunders was Baptist.

Death
Saunders died on February 10, 2012.

References

1923 births
2012 deaths
Baptists from Michigan
People from Orlando, Florida
Wayne State University alumni
Women state legislators in Michigan
African-American women in politics
African-American state legislators in Michigan
Democratic Party members of the Michigan House of Representatives
20th-century African-American women
20th-century African-American politicians
21st-century African-American women
21st-century African-American people
20th-century American women politicians
20th-century American politicians
20th-century Baptists